Two ships have been named Olau Britannia:

 , in service 1982–1990
 , in service 1990–1994

Ship names